Maryanovka is a rural locality (a village) in Stepanovsky Selsoviet, Aurgazinsky District, Bashkortostan, Russia. The population was 227 as of 2010. There are 3 streets.

Geography 
Maryanovka is located 16 km west of Tolbazy (the district's administrative centre) by road. Stepanovka is the nearest rural locality.

References 

Rural localities in Aurgazinsky District